Mary Jean Chan  is a Hong Kong Chinese poet, lecturer, editor and critic. Chan's first poetry collection, Flèche, won the 2019 Costa Book Award in the poetry category. Their second book, Bright Fear, is forthcoming from Faber in 2023. Chan is a Ledbury Poetry Critic and was guest co-editor of The Poetry Review for Spring 2020. Chan is a judge for the 2023  Booker Prize.

Biography

Mary Jean Chan was born in 1990 and was raised in Hong Kong. 
They graduated Phi Beta Kappa from Swarthmore College in 2012 with a BA in Political Science, minoring in English Literature. Chan furthered their studies at the University of Oxford where they obtained an MPhil in 2015 in International Development. Chan also completed an MA and a PhD in Creative Writing at Royal Holloway, University of London.

In 2018, Chan's pamphlet, A Hurry of English, was published by ignitionpress and was chosen as a Poetry Book Society Summer Pamphlet Choice. Chan's debut poetry collection Flèche was published by Faber & Faber (2019). It was chosen as a Poetry Book Society Autumn Recommendation. The book won the Costa Book Award for Poetry in 2019.

In 2019, Chan was named as one of Jackie Kay's 10 Best BAME Writers in Britain, with Kay describing Chan's poetry as "psychologically astute and culturally complex."

Chan is a tenured Senior Lecturer in Creative Writing (Poetry) at Oxford Brookes University and also serves as a tutor on the MSt in Creative Writing at the University of Oxford.

Awards
2021 Lambda Literary Awards (Finalist for Flèche)
2020 Seamus Heaney Centre for Poetry First Collection Prize (Shortlisted for Flèche)
2020 Jhalak Prize for Book of the Year by a Writer of Colour (Shortlisted for Flèche)
2020 John Pollard Foundation International Poetry Prize (Shortlisted for Flèche)
2020 Dylan Thomas Prize (Shortlisted for Flèche)
2019 Costa Book Award for Poetry, Flèche
2019 Eric Gregory Award, A Hurry Of English
2019 Forward Prize for Best Single Poem (Shortlisted for 'The Window')
2018 Poetry Society Geoffrey Dearmer Award
2017 Forward Prize for Best Single Poem (Shortlisted for '//')
2017 Poetry Society Anne Born Prize
2017 National Poetry Competition (Second Place), 'The Window'
2016 Oxford Brookes International Poetry Competition, 'Wet Nurse'

Bibliography
 Bright Fear (Faber & Faber, 2023)
 100 Queer Poems (Vintage, 2022)
 Flèche (Faber & Faber, 2019)
 A Hurry of English (ignitionpress, 2018)

External links
Official website

References

1990 births
Living people
21st-century British poets
British women poets
Alumni of the University of Oxford
Hong Kong women writers
21st-century British women writers